The 2004 Swedish Golf Tour, known as the Telia Tour for sponsorship reasons, was the 19th season of the Swedish Golf Tour, a series of professional golf tournaments for women held in Sweden and Finland.

Linda Wessberg and Maria Bodén both won two events and Emelie Svenningsson won the Order of Merit.

Schedule
The season consisted of 12 tournaments played between May and September, where one event was held in Finland.

Order of Merit

Source:

See also
2004 Swedish Golf Tour (men's tour)

References

External links
Official homepage of the Swedish Golf Tour

Swedish Golf Tour (women)
Swedish Golf Tour (women)